This is a list of members of the Victorian Legislative Council between the elections of 15 June 1940 and 12 June 1943. 
As half of the Legislative Council's terms expired at each triennial election, half of these members were elected at the 1937 triennial election with terms expiring in 1943, while the other half were elected at the 1940 triennial election with terms expiring in 1946.

 On 9 April 1942, Henry Pye, Country MLC for North Western Province, died. Country candidate Percy Byrnes won the resulting by-election in May 1942.
 On 20 May 1942, Archibald Crofts, United Australia MLC for Monash, died. United Australia candidate Sir Frank Beaurepaire won the resulting by-election in July 1942.

Frank Clarke was President of the Council; William Edgar was Chairman of Committees.

References

 Re-member (a database of all Victorian MPs since 1851). Parliament of Victoria.
 Victorian Year Book 1939–40

Members of the Parliament of Victoria by term
20th-century Australian politicians